The 2022 Motocross des Nations was a motocross race held on 24 and 25 September 2022 in Buchanan, United States. This was the fifth time that the event was held in the United States and the second time at this track. Italy went into the event as the defending champions after winning their third title in 2021.

Entry list 
Start numbers were allocated based on the team finishes from the 2021 competition. This allocated number plates 1, 2 & 3 to Italy (1st), 4, 5 & 6 to the Netherlands (2nd) and 7, 8 & 9 to the United Kingdom (3rd). Russia, who finished fourth in the 2021 competition, was not allowed to compete after the FIM suspended all Russian competitors following the 2022 Russian invasion of Ukraine.

The official entry list was published on 1 September.

Thirty-four teams competed at the event, three more than in the previous edition. Of these teams, 19 competed in 2021, with increasing travel costs seeing many of the smaller European countries unable to attend. In addition to Russia, Austria and Denmark who finished 9th and 10th in the previous edition, made it 3 of the top-10 countries missing for 2022. Czech Republic, Bulgaria, Poland, Slovenia, Slovakia, Croatia, Portugal, Ukraine and Greece were the other nations absent from 2021. Slovenia not attending meant that 2022 MXGP world champion Tim Gajser would not race, whilst Portugal missed the event for the first time since 1993.

However, many countries made their return to the event after being absent in 2021 due to COVID-19 restrictions. Home nation United States returned for the first time since 2019, so did Australia, Brazil, Japan, New Zealand and Norway. Mexico appeared for the first time since the 2018 edition, the last to be held in the U.S., as were the Philippines (making their third appearance) and Israel. Ecuador made their third appearance, their last being in 2010, as was Chile, whose last event came in 2007. Guam and Honduras made their debuts at the Motocross des Nations in 2022. 

To round out the entry list, two combined teams appeared for the first time, organised by two of the FIM's continental federations, with the intention of fielding riders from smaller nations who cannot afford to send a full team. FIM Latin America hosts riders from Bolivia, Costa Rica and the Dominican Republic, which meant the first appearance of a Bolivian rider at the MXDN. FIM Europe meanwhile hosted riders from Hungary, Czech Republic and Ukraine.

Qualifying Races 
Qualifying is run on a class by class basis.
Top 19 countries after qualifying go directly to the main Motocross des Nations races. The remaining countries go to a smaller final.
Best 2 scores count.

MXGP

MX2

Open

Qualification Standings 

 Qualified Nations

Motocross des Nations races 
The main Motocross des Nations races consist of 3 races which combine two classes together in each. Lowest score wins with each nation allowed to drop their worst score after the final race.

MXGP+MX2

MX2+Open

MXGP+Open

References 

2022
Motocross des Nations
Motocross des Nations
Motocross des Nations